Ka Yiu San is an American bioengineer currently on the faculty at Rice University and an Elected Fellow of the American Association for the Advancement of Science.

Education 
In 1978, San earned a BS degree from Rice University. San earned a MS and PhD degrees from the California Institute of Technology.

Career 
San is a professor of Bioengineering Department and Chemical Engineering Deparyment at Rice University in Houston, Texas. San is the head of the Metabolic Engineering Lab. San has over 25 patents and patent applications. San is the co-author of Bioengineering Fundamentals, a text book.

References

Year of birth missing (living people)
Living people
Fellows of the American Association for the Advancement of Science
21st-century American engineers
Rice University faculty
Rice University alumni
California Institute of Technology alumni